Jean-Sébastien Robicquet, was born on the 20th of September 1966 in Bègles, France. He is a french oenologist, entrepreneur, master-distiller and company director. He founded EuroWineGate in 2001 which became Maison Villevert in 2016.

Spirits and brands creator
After studying biology and oenology and working for multiple cognacs and wines brands, Jean-Sébastien Robicquet created EuroWineGate, an online Wine & Spirits shop, but he also wanted to create his own spirits brands.

In 2001, Jean-Sébastien Robicquet created, in partnership with Diageo, Cîroc, a french vodka crafted with grapes and known for its five-timed distillation.

G'Vine, a french gin made with grape liquor and vine flowers which are distilled with perfumer skills to extract their aromas was created in 2006.

Then, in 2013, La Quintinye Vermouth Royal is crafted with Pineau des Charentes and a blend of 37 plants.

Maison Villevert and Jean-Sébastien Robicquet also created other spirits brands like June Gin Liqueur, a gin liquor made with wild peaches, Excellia, a tequila which is aged in Cognac and Sauternes casks, La Guilde du Cognac, a Cognac brand which centers around geographic characteristics of the terroir, and Nouaison Gin, a grape-based gin made for the bartending world.

Guilde du Cognac
Guilde du Cognac is collection of cognacs created in 2017 by Jean-Sébastien Robicquet, president and founder of Maison Villevert. This collection aims at showcasing local "terroirs" and craft distillers. It comprises limited series sold only in wine & spirits shops.

The collection comprises four bottles of cognac. Jean-Sébastien Robicquet says that it was created as a nod to the origins of cognac: it would be unfair to forget that craft distilling is born here, in Cognac. Each bottle is created to represent the values of its original terroir and of the craft distiller who produced it.

This range was also the first time village-specific cognacs were introduced:

 Saint-Preuil cognac, in the Grande Champagne area.
 Saint-Germain-de-Vibrac cognac, in the Petite Champagne area.
 Cherves-Richemont cognac, in the Borderies area.
 Lorignac cognac, in the Fins Bois area.

Distribution
In partnership with William Grant & Sons, Guilde du Cognac reached the Asian and is now sold in Asian airports. The collection is also sold at French, Spanish and Portuguese wine merchants through Renaissance Spirits.

Awards
 2018 International Spirit & Wine Competition:
 Silver 2018 Cognac Awards-Borderies-Vintage-2010
 Silver outstanding 2018 in Cognac-Fine Bois-Vintage-2011
 Silver 2018 in Cognac-Petite Champagne-Vintage-2007
 Silver 2018 in Cognac-Grande Champagne-Extra
 2018 San Francisco World Spirits Competition:
 Two double gold medals for Cherves-Richemont village in Borderies and Saint-Preuil village in Grande Champagne bottles
 Gold medal for the Saint-Germain-de-Vibrac in Petite Champagne bottle
 Silver medal for the Lorignac in Fins Bois bottle

References

Living people
1966 births
People from Bègles
Oenologists